YWCA is a historic YWCA building located at Muncie, Delaware County, Indiana. It was built in 1925, and is a three-story, five bay by three bay, restrained Colonial Revival style brick building with limestone detailing.  It has swimming pool in the basement, meeting and recreation rooms on the first floor, and sleeping rooms on the second and third floors.

It was added to the National Register of Historic Places in 1989.

References

YWCA buildings
Clubhouses on the National Register of Historic Places in Indiana
Colonial Revival architecture in Indiana
Buildings and structures completed in 1925
Buildings and structures in Muncie, Indiana
National Register of Historic Places in Muncie, Indiana
History of women in Indiana